The 1991 World Sambo Championships were held in two places because of international politics. In 1991 some countries left the long standing FIAS World Sambo Championships to create their own World Championship FMS / IFS (Federation Mondiale de Sambo / International Sambo Federation). The 1991 Soviet Union sambo team would be the last Soviet athletic team to compete as one country before the Soviet break up. The 1991 Soviet team became the last to ever win the World Sambo Championships as a country. The FIAS World Sambo Championships were held in Montreal, Quebec, Canada and the new FMS World Sambo Championships were held in Chambéry, France in December. Following the 1991 World Championships FIAS continued its control of International Sambo and remains the governing body for the World Sambo Championships.

Medal overview (FMS)

Medal overview (FIAS) 

note: Medal table isn't complete.

External links 
FIAS results on Sambo.net.ua
FMS results

World Sambo Championships
1991 in sambo (martial art)
Sports competitions in Montreal